"San Francisco Is a Lonely Town" is a song written in 1969 by the Nashville songwriter Ben Peters. Two versions of the song charted in 1969 – one by Ben Peters himself (#46 country, Peters' only charting hit), and the single by Joe Simon, which reached #79 on the US pop charts, #29 on the R&B charts.

Review
The novelist and songwriter Alice Randall reviewed Linda Martell's album Color Me Country in 2010, and wrote:

Other versions
Other versions of the song released in 1969 and after, were by:
 Roberta Sherwood (single)
Mel Carter (single), 
Eddy Arnold on his album The Warmth of Eddy, 
Fred Hughes on his album Baby Boy, 
Charlie Rich on his album The Fabulous Charlie Rich,  The Charlie Rich version was remixed by the French group Nouvelle Vague on the 2007 remix album Late Night Tales: Nouvelle Vague.
O. C. Smith on his album O.C. Smith at Home.
Linda Martell, the African-American country artist, recorded the song on her 1970 album Color Me Country. 
Vikki Carr put the tune on her 1971 album The Ways to Love a Man. 
Glen Campbell recorded it on his 1976 album Bloodline, 
Jimmy "Orion" Ellis on his 1979 album Sunrise.
Nick Nixon, a country musician whose cover reached #86 on the country charts in 1979.

References

Songs written by Ben Peters
Eddy Arnold songs
Glen Campbell songs
Joe Simon (musician) songs
1969 songs
Songs about San Francisco
Songs about loneliness